Connie Mack Rea (January 27, 1931 – May 5, 2020) was an American former professional basketball player. Rea was selected in the 1953 NBA draft by the Baltimore Bullets after a collegiate career at Centenary. He was selected to play for the North team in the 1949 North-South Cage Classic.

References

1931 births
2020 deaths
American men's basketball players
Baltimore Bullets (1944–1954) draft picks
Baltimore Bullets (1944–1954) players
Basketball players from Indiana
Centenary Gentlemen basketball players
Forwards (basketball)
Guards (basketball)
Vanderbilt Commodores men's basketball players